Lila Kumari Bagale Somai is a Nepalese politician, belonging to the Communist Party of Nepal (Maoist). In April 2008, she won the Palpa-2 seat in the Constituent Assembly election, defeating the sitting CPN(UML) MP Som Prasad Pandey. Somai got 12750 votes whereas Pandey got 10929 votes.

References

Living people
Communist Party of Nepal (Maoist Centre) politicians
21st-century Nepalese women politicians
21st-century Nepalese politicians
Nepalese atheists
Year of birth missing (living people)
Members of the 1st Nepalese Constituent Assembly